Kazakh kuresi as a part of belt wrestling competition was contested at the 2017 Asian Indoor and Martial Arts Games in Ashgabat, Turkmenistan on 21 September 2017. The competition took place at Ashgabat Main Indoor Arena.

Medalists

Medal table

Results

70 kg
21 September

90 kg
21 September

+90 kg
21 September

References 

 Belt Wrestling Results Book

External links
 Official website

2017 Asian Indoor and Martial Arts Games events
Asian Indoor and Martial Arts Games
2017